Tarkughat  is a village development committee in Lamjung District in the Gandaki Zone of northern-central Nepal. At the time of the 1991 Nepal census it had a population of 2650 people living in 536 individual households. This village lies at the bank of Marsyangdi river.

References

External links
UN map of the municipalities of Lamjung District

Populated places in Lamjung District